Cleddon Hall, formerly known as Ravenscroft, is a 19th-century Victorian country house in Trellech, Monmouthshire, Wales. In the later 19th century it was owned by Lord and Lady Amberley, and their youngest son, the philosopher Bertrand Russell, was born at the hall on 18 May 1872.

History and description
In 1870 the hall, then known as Ravenscroft, was purchased by John Russell, Viscount Amberley and his wife Katharine. Russell, the eldest son of Earl Russell, twice Prime Minister of the United Kingdom, and his wife, daughter of the 2nd Baron Stanley,  were highly unconventional for their times. The antiquarian and genealogist Joseph Bradney, in his A History of Monmouthshire from the Coming of the Normans into Wales down to the Present Time, described the couple as "possessed of views on life in strange discord to those of the simple-minded people among whom they settled". Religious sceptics, and supporters of women's rights and abortion, they lived in an open marriage at the hall with their children's tutor, Douglas Spalding. On 18 May 1872 their son, Bertrand was born at Cleddon. Within three years of his birth, his parents were dead and he was sent to live with his grandparents in London.

Although initially unconvinced when her husband suggested buying the estate, Katharine Russell came to appreciate Cleddon, becoming "quite enchanted with the wildness and beauty of the place". In his autobiography published in 1967, her son described the hall's isolated setting as "very lonely". Cleddon is not listed by Cadw and the architectural historian John Newman does not mention the house in his Gwent/Monmouthshire volume of the Pevsner Buildings of Wales series. The house is recorded by the Royal Commission on the Ancient and Historical Monuments of Wales in their National Monuments of Wales (Coflein) database. Cleddon Hall remains a private home.

Notes

References

Sources 
 
 
 

Country houses in Monmouthshire
History of Monmouthshire
Bertrand Russell